Julio Salvador y Díaz-Benjumea (22 May 1910 – 22 June 1987) was a Spanish general who served as Minister of the Air of Spain between 1969 and 1973, during the Francoist dictatorship.

References

1910 births
1987 deaths
Defence ministers of Spain
Government ministers during the Francoist dictatorship